Brachytrupes membranaceus, the tobacco cricket, is a species of cricket in the family Gryllidae. It is a pest of crops including young tobacco plants. There are four subspecies, all of which are native to Africa.

Subspecies
Four subspecies are recognised :
B. m. colosseus Saussure, 1899 – Madagascar
B. m. hoggarensis Chopard, 1941 – Algeria
B. m. mauritanicus Chopard, 1952 – Mauritania
B. m. membranaceus (Drury, 1770) – Kenya, Tanzania and other countries in East Africa

Description
The adult B. membranaceus has a plump brown body, a broad blunt head, long antennae and powerful legs.

Biology
Brachytrupes membranaceus is nocturnal. The burrow is dug by the mandibles, and the fore-legs are used to move loose soil and push it out of the entrance.

The crickets live almost entirely underground, each in its own burrow. Mating takes place in the male's burrow and the female may remain there till the eggs are laid, in a walled-off side tunnel. In Zimbabwe, breeding takes place in February and March. The female lays around two hundred eggs which hatch about a month later. The nymphs crawl out of the burrow and disperse, each digging a burrow of its own. At first the nymphs grow rapidly but growth slows during the dry season from June to October. When succulent young plant material becomes available in November, growth rates speed up, with adults emerging from December onwards. There is just one generation each year.

The diet is grasses, succulent parts of plants and the suckers of trees such as Brachystegia and Isoberlinia. In cultivated areas, foodstuffs may include seedlings, transplanted plants, vegetables, tobacco, maize and field beans. Vegetable matter is carried underground and packed into storage chambers. It does not ferment, so it is probable that it is cut and allowed to wilt before being carried underground. Overly dry material may be allowed to soften with dew before storage.

References

Gryllinae
Insects described in 1770
Orthoptera of Africa
Taxa named by Dru Drury